Sharp Entertainment is a television production company based in Manhattan, New York. Founded by Matt Sharp in 2003, they have produced thousands of hours of programing in reality television. They produce TLC's top rated television franchise, 90 Day Fiancé, which consists of 6 spin off series. The February 23, 2020 premiere of 90 Day Fiancé: Before the 90 Days had 3.3 million viewers, putting TLC in the #2 spot for the night. Some of their other hits include Love After Lockup (We TV), Man v. Food (Cooking Channel), Marrying Millions (Lifetime), Doomsday Preppers (National Geographic), Extreme Couponing (TLC), and The Fabulous Life (VH1).

Sharp Entertainment was acquired by Industrial Media (formerly known as CORE Media Group) in 2012.

List of television shows produced
 90 Day Fiancé
 Most Outrageous Animals
 Man v. Food
 Underdog to Wonderdog
 Call of the Wildman
 Ask Aida
 Extreme
 The Fabulous Life of...
 Biography
 Videos That Rocked the World
 Most Chrismasy Places in America
 Most Terrifying Places in America
 Christmas to the Extreme
 20 Most Outrageous Moments
 25 Biggest Real Estate Mistakes on HGTV
 Extreme Halloween
 Confessions of a Matchmaker
 NoFX Backstage Passport
 The iPod Revolution
 30 Even Scarier Movie Moments
 Criminal Records on TruTV
 Misunderstood: Eminem
 100 Greatest Red Carpet Moments
 Red Hot Red Carpet
 100 Funniest Movies
 Great Thing About Holidays
 Doomsday Preppers
 Celebrity Nightmares Decoded
 Love After Lockup
 Extreme Couponing
 Ghosted: Love Gone Missing
 Marrying Millions

References

External links
 

Television production companies of the United States